Walter Ronald Wynn (2 November 1923 – 8 October 1983) was a Welsh professional footballer who played as a defender. He made 182 appearances in the English Football League for Wrexham. He also played for West New York and Winsford United.

He also guested for Chester City during World War II.

References

1923 births
1983 deaths
Welsh footballers
Association football defenders
Wrexham A.F.C. players
Winsford United F.C. players
Chester City F.C. wartime guest players
English Football League players